The men's 10 kilometre sprint at the 2003 Asian Winter Games was held on 3 February 2003 at Iwakisan Sports Park, Japan.

Schedule
All times are Japan Standard Time (UTC+09:00)

Results

References

Results

External links
Schedule

Men Sprint